Fatehgarh is a cantonment town in Farrukhabad district  in the state of Uttar Pradesh, India.  It is located on the south bank of the Ganges River. It is the administrative headquarters of Farrukhabad District. Fatehgarh derives its name from an old fort. It is a small city with no significant industrial activity. Asia's largest potato market is located in Farrukhabad, as well as a holy place for Buddhists (Sankissa). It contains a large Indian Army establishment in the form of The Rajput Regimental Centre, 114 Infantry Battalion TA and The Sikh Light Infantry Center.

Demographics 
As per provisional data of 2011 census, Farrukhabad-cum-Fategarh urban agglomeration had a population of 290,540, out of which males were 154,630 and females were 135,910. The literacy rate was 75.60 per cent.

 India census, Fatehgarh had a population of 14,682.  Males constitute 60% of the population and females 40%. Fatehgarh has an average literacy rate of 76%, higher than the national average of 59.5%: male literacy is 83%, and female literacy is 65%. In Fatehgarh, 12% of the population is under 6 years of age.

Notable people

 Mriganka Sur, neuroscientist
 George Stuart Fullerton, psychologist
 Anna Martha Fullerton, physician
 Rear-Admiral Spencer Login, C.V.O., Royal Navy (1851-1909), rugby union international who represented England in 1875

References 

Cities and towns in Farrukhabad district
Cantonment towns in Uttar Pradesh
Cantonments of British India
Populated places established in 1714
1714 establishments in Asia